Queen and I is a 2012 South Korean television series starring Ji Hyun-woo and Yoo In-na. The story centers around obscure actress Choi Hee-jin (played by Yoo In-na, in her first leading role) who falls in love with Kim Bung-do (played by Ji Hyun-woo), a time-traveling scholar from the Joseon Dynasty (1392-1910) who jumps 300 years into the future to the 21st century.

It was broadcast on cable channel tvN from April 18 to June 7, 2012 on Wednesdays and Thursdays at 23:00 for 16 episodes.

Synopsis

On the year 1694, Joseon Dynasty: Kim Bung-do (Ji Hyun-woo) is a noble-born scholar and his family's sole survivor after they were massacred in a conspiracy. Kim Bung-do supports the reinstatement of Queen In-hyun, who was deposed due to scheming by royal concubine Lady Jang.

On the year 2012, modern-day Seoul: Choi Hee-jin (Yoo In-na), an unsuccessful actress, lands her big break when she is cast as Queen In-hyun in the television drama "New Jang Heebin". Due to a mysterious talisman, Kim Bung-do time travels to 2012, where he crosses paths with Choi Hee-jin and falls in love.

Cast

Main
 Ji Hyun-woo as Kim Bung-do
 Yoo In-na as Choi Hee-jin
 Kim Jin-woo as Han Dong-min, Hee-jin's ex-boyfriend	
 Ga Deuk-hee as Jo Soo-kyung, Hee-jin's friend and manager

Supporting
 Jin Ye-sol as Yoon-wol
 Um Hyo-sup as Minister Min Ahm
 Lee Kwan-hoon as Ja-soo
 Ji Nam-hyuk as Han-dong
 Park Young-rin as Yoon Na-jung
 Jo Dal-hwan as Chun-soo
 Seo Woo-jin as King Sukjong
 Kim Hae-in as Queen In-hyun
 Choi Woo-ri as Jang Hee-bin
 Kim Won-hae as Eunuch Hong
 Kim Kyul as Young Myung
 Oh Hee-joon as Officer Hong's soldier
 Yang Jae-jee
 Park Pal-young
 Seo Ho-chul

Production
One of the filming locations was Gwanghwamun Plaza, where the two lead characters, Kim Boong-do and Choi Hee-jin share a kiss dubbed the 'Gwanghwamun kiss' against the backdrop of Gwanghwamun.

Original soundtrack

Awards and nominations

Remake
A Chinese remake of the series, titled Love Weaves Through a Millennium, aired in 2015.

References

External links
 

2012 South Korean television series debuts
2012 South Korean television series endings
Television series set in the Joseon dynasty
Korean-language television shows
South Korean time travel television series
TVN (South Korean TV channel) television dramas
South Korean romantic fantasy television series
South Korean historical television series
South Korean television series remade in other languages
Television series by Chorokbaem Media
Television shows written by Song Jae-jung